La escopeta nacional (in English, The National Shotgun) is a 1978 Spanish comedy film directed by Luis García Berlanga. The first installment in a critically and commercially successful trilogy, the picture is an indictment of the legacy of Francisco Franco and the business classes upon whom he depended for support. The picture was followed in the trilogy by Patrimonio nacional and Nacional III, both of which were released in 1981.

External links
 

1978 comedy-drama films
1978 films
Spanish comedy-drama films
Films directed by Luis García Berlanga
1970s Spanish-language films
Catalan-language films
1978 comedy films
1978 drama films
1978 multilingual films
Spanish multilingual films
1970s Spanish films